Red Wharf Bay, also known as Traeth Coch (Welsh for "red beach"), is a village and a wide sandy bay in the Anglesey Area of Outstanding Natural Beauty on the east coast of the island of Anglesey in Wales. The bay lies between the villages of Pentraeth and Benllech. It is also close to Castell Mawr Rock, thought to be the site of an Iron Age fort.

Red Wharf Bay beach itself has a large expanse of sand at low tide.

Village
The village of Red Wharf Bay is on the western shore of the bay. The village is linked to Benllech and Pentraeth via the Anglesey Coastal Path. Red Wharf Bay has three restaurants—The Tavern on the Bay, The Ship Inn, and The Boathouse—all with views of the bay.

Wildlife
The bay attracts an abundance or wildlife, including a large number of waterfowl and wading birds, such as oystercatcher, shelduck, purple sandpiper, curlew and dunlin. The bay is bordered by salt marshes and sand dunes. Some of these dunes are rich in shell fragments that support the flora common to lime-rich areas, including the pyramidal orchid.

Events
Each year the Red Wharf Bay Sailing Club Anglesey Offshore Dinghy Race takes place from Beaumaris to  Traeth Bychan. The  race runs up the Menai Strait and down the Anglesey coast.

History
There was once a railway line which terminated at the bay, the Red Wharf Bay branch line, which left the Anglesey Central Railway at Pentre Berw. Stone for the Admiralty Arch, Holyhead was quarried near the bay.

References

External links

360 Panoramic view of Red Wharf Bay (North side)- uses QuickTime

Llanfair-Mathafarn-Eithaf
Pentraeth
Bays of Anglesey